Offspring Entertainment is a production company owned by producers Adam Shankman and Jennifer Gibgot. The company was established by the siblings in 2004 after their work together on the film The Wedding Planner, which Gibgot produced and Shankman directed.

Offspring Entertainment, in addition to several feature films on the development slate, has a deal with Warner Bros Television and Warner Horizon, and are currently developing television series and events for both network and cable. In the past they have had first look development deals with New Line Cinema and Walt Disney Studios Motion Pictures. Prior to opening Offspring Entertainment, Shankman was Hollywood's go-to choreographer and Gibgot worked with Tapestry Films. Gibgot got her start as a producer at Tapestry Films where she produced romantic comedy favorites The Wedding Planner and She's All That. Shankman got his start as a dancer and choreographer, teaching movie stars and television stars how to dance before branching into directing and producing.

Filmography 
 Step Up (2006) (with Touchstone Pictures and Summit Entertainment) - Channing Tatum, Jenna Dewan
 Premonition (2007) (with TriStar Pictures and MGM) - Sandra Bullock
 Hairspray (2007) (with New Line Cinema)  - Nikki Blonsky, John Travolta, Michelle Pfeiffer, Christopher Walken, Amanda Bynes, James Marsden, Queen Latifah, Brittany Snow, Zac Efron, Elijah Kelley, Allison Janney
 Step Up 2: The Streets (2008) (with Touchstone Pictures and Summit Entertainment) - Will Kemp
 Bedtime Stories (2008) (with Walt Disney Pictures and Happy Madison Productions) - Adam Sandler
 17 Again (2009) (with New Line Cinema) - Zac Efron, Matthew Perry, and Leslie Mann
 The Last Song (2010) (with  Touchstone Pictures) - Miley Cyrus, Liam Hemsworth, Greg Kinnear
 Step Up 3D (2010) (with Touchstone Pictures and Summit Entertainment) - Adam Sevani, Alyson Stoner
 Going the Distance (2010) (with Warner Bros. and New Line Cinema) - Drew Barrymore, Christina Applegate, Justin Long
 Rock of Ages (2012) (with Warner Bros. and New Line Cinema) - Julianne Hough, Diego Boneta, Russell Brand, Paul Giamatti, Catherine Zeta-Jones, Malin Åkerman, Mary J. Blige, Alec Baldwin, and Tom Cruise
 Step Up Revolution (2012) (with Summit Entertainment) - Kathryn McCormick, Ryan Guzman, Misha Gabriel, Peter Gallagher
 Step Up: All In (2014)
 Status Update (2018)
 After (2019) (with Voltage Pictures and distributed by Aviron)
 He's All That (2021) (with Miramax)
 The Magic Finger (TBA) (with A24)
 No Baggage (TBA) (with New Line Cinema) - Shailene Woodley

References 

Film production companies of the United States